Vikram Nagar is a new upcoming residential locality within Ujjain, Madhya Pradesh. Here also many developers and real estate prices have shot up and are comparable to the posh areas of Ujjain. Vikram Nagar is located near the Vikramnagar railway station a suburban station of Ujjain. It is located near Vikram University as well.

Etymology
The name of the area is derived from King Vikramaditya of the Ujjaini Kingdom.

See also 
 Ujjain

References

External links 
 Official website

Neighbourhoods in Ujjain